The Quarterly Publication of Individuals Who Have Chosen to Expatriate, also known as the Quarterly Publication of Individuals, Who Have Chosen to Expatriate, as Required by Section 6039G, is a publication of the United States Internal Revenue Service (IRS) in the Federal Register, listing the names of certain individuals with respect to whom the IRS has received information regarding loss of citizenship during the preceding quarter.

Overview
The practice of publishing the names of ex-citizens is not unique to the United States. South Korea's Ministry of Justice, for example, also publishes the names of people losing South Korean nationality in the government gazette. Prior to the 1990s, however, loss of United States citizenship was not a matter of public record; the State Department considered that routine disclosure of the names of people giving up U.S. citizenship might violate the Privacy Act of 1974 and other laws.

The United States government first released a list of former U.S. citizens in a State Department letter to Congress made public by a 1995 Joint Committee on Taxation report. That report contained the names of 978 people who had relinquished U.S. citizenship between January 1, 1994 and April 25, 1995. This action was in the larger context of widespread media attention to the issue of wealthy individuals who gave up citizenship to avoid United States taxes. As a result, several legislators proposed bills or amendments to end the confidentiality surrounding loss of citizenship, and to publish the names of ex-citizens. The one that eventually passed was an amendment by Sam Gibbons (D-FL) to the Health Insurance Portability and Accountability Act of 1996. That amendment added new provisions to the Internal Revenue Code (now at ) to require that the Treasury Department publish the names of persons relinquishing U.S. citizenship within thirty days after the end of each calendar quarter. Publication began in 1996; lists published in 1997 included the names of people losing citizenship after 1995. The list includes only the names of former citizens, not their reasons for giving up citizenship or other information about them. Lawyers familiar with the process state that it takes roughly six months after people give up citizenship for their names to appear in the list.

Congress' motive for requiring this publication was to "shame or embarrass" people who give up U.S. citizenship for tax reasons. However, Michael S. Kirsch of Notre Dame Law School questions the effectiveness of this, given that it may result in the shaming of people who give up U.S. citizenship for other reasons, while having little effect on or even acting as a badge of honor for wealthy individuals who are "particularly individualistic and unconcerned with how they may be perceived by the general population." Gibbons expected that the list would include only "a handful of the wealthiest of the wealthy" motivated solely by taxes; however, the people named in the list turned out to have a wide variety of motivations for emigrating from the U.S. and later giving up citizenship, and few were publicly known to be wealthy. As a Wall Street Journal article described the political environment of the mid-1990s which led to the creation of the list: "Congress got mad at legal aliens who use social services but don't become U.S. citizens. Less noisily, it got mad at Americans who become legal aliens in other countries, use services there, but decide not to remain U.S. citizens for life."

Criteria for inclusion in list

Comparisons with other sources of data on ex-citizens suggest that the lists of ex-citizens published in the Federal Register may not necessarily include all ex-citizens. Media reports from authors who believe that the IRS list is supposed to include all expatriates have suggested this means the Federal Register expatriate list has been "lowballing its numbers." Other sources advance a variety of explanations.

Non-covered expatriates

There are differences of opinion among lawyers over whether  mandates that the names of only some or all former citizens must appear in the Quarterly Publication. One opinion is that only those who are subject to the expatriation tax (so-called "covered expatriates") appear in the list. (Under current law, "covered expatriates" are those with more than $2,000,000 in assets, an average of $124,000—adjusted for inflation—in taxes owed or paid over the preceding five years, or who are unable to certify under penalty of perjury that they have complied with all tax form filing and payment obligations in the preceding five years.) Those with this opinion include David Lesperance and John Gaver. In contrast, Andrew Mitchel, a Connecticut tax lawyer interviewed by The Wall Street Journal for its reports on Americans giving up citizenship, states that the list is required to include all former citizens. Michael Kirsch also states that the list is required to include all former citizens, not just those deemed by Section 877 to be giving up citizenship for tax reasons.

Under  (the old expatriation tax statute) as in effect from the 1996 passage of HIPAA until the American Jobs Creation Act of 2004, expatriation tax was imposed only if the IRS determined that "one of the principal purposes" of a U.S. person's abandonment of citizenship or permanent residence status was avoidance of taxation. Nevertheless, according to a 2000 Congressional Research Service memorandum, the IRS did not at that time make the determination of principal purposes before including a person's name in the Quarterly Publication, and so stated that "these lists include expatriates whose motivation may not have been tax avoidance".

Robert Wood of Wood LLP in San Francisco, writing in Forbes, states that the Quarterly Publication does not include "[w]hat is often called consular expatriations, where people don’t file exit tax forms with the IRS". The American Bar Association's Taxation Section believes  should be read not to require persons whose loss of citizenship occurred before the passage of the American Jobs Creation Act of 2004 to file the exit tax form (Form 8854), and has urged the issuance of Treasury regulations clarifying this interpretation.

Non-citizen former permanent residents

The Quarterly Publication may be required to include the names not just of former U.S. citizens but of certain former permanent residents ("ex-green card holders") as well. Under , "the Federal agency primarily responsible for administering the immigration laws shall provide to the Secretary the name of each lawful permanent resident of the United States (within the meaning of section 7701 (b)(6)) whose status as such has been revoked or has been administratively or judicially determined to have been abandoned." The Quarterly Publication includes a statement that "for purposes of this listing, long-term residents, as defined in section 877(e)(2), are treated as if they were citizens of the United States who lost citizenship". Andrew Mitchel, a Connecticut tax lawyer, believes that the law requires the IRS to include former long-term green card holders in the Quarterly Publication, but given the number of names which appear, he finds it unlikely that they are actually included.

In 2000, a Government Accountability Office report noted that while the Immigration and Naturalization Service provided data to the IRS in electronic form identifying individuals who gave up permanent residence status, the data did not fulfill the IRS' needs because it did not generally include Taxpayer Identification Numbers nor contain information on the length of time for which each of the former permanent residents had held his or her status, and thus the IRS could not use the information for tracking people who were subject to the expatriation tax. The tax law definition of abandonment of lawful permanent residence does not include people whose green cards expire; they continue to be subject to federal tax as U.S. residents rather than the expatriation tax, and are not regarded by the IRS as having "expatriated" even though they may no longer possess the right to reside in the United States. Additionally, a green card holder who takes a tax treaty-based return position as a non-resident of the U.S. also triggers the expatriation tax.

Reinsurance companies

Three reinsurance companies have been included in the Quarterly Publication: RBC Reinsurance, Ltd. in Q2 2000; ING Re Limited (Ireland) in Q1 2003; and Imagine International Reinsurance Limited in Q2 2003. International tax practitioners were uncertain why companies would appear in the Quarterly Publication, as the expatriation tax provisions and the provisions of  establishing the list itself all refer to "individual[s]" losing United States citizenship; although the term "individual" is not defined in the Internal Revenue Code, it is unlikely that it could be interpreted to include entities (unlike the term "person", which  explicitly defines to include legal persons). Furthermore, Section 6039G makes no allowance for publication of the names of entities that engage in tax inversions (which are sometimes mistakenly referred to in the popular press as "corporations renouncing their citizenship").

Comparison with other sources of data on ex-citizens

Since 1998, the Federal Bureau of Investigation has also maintained its own list of people who have renounced citizenship under , as this is one of the categories of people prohibited from purchasing firearms under the Gun Control Act of 1968 and who must be entered into the National Instant Criminal Background Check System (NICS) under the Brady Handgun Violence Prevention Act of 1993. The names are not made public, but each month the FBI issues a report on the number of entries added in each category. NICS covers a different population from the Federal Register expatriate list: the former includes only those who renounce U.S. citizenship, while the latter should include those who voluntarily lose citizenship by any means, and possibly certain former permanent residents as well.

In 2012, the FBI added 4,652 records to the NICS "renounced U.S. citizenship" category in 2012, much larger than the number of names published in the Federal Register expatriate lists during the same period. About 2,900 of those were added to NICS in one large batch in October 2012; FBI spokesman Stephen G. Fischer attributed this jump to State Department efforts to clear a backlog of earlier renunciants who had not been provided to the FBI previously. However, in 2013, the number of records of renunciants added to NICS again exceeded the number of names published in the Federal Register expatriate list, with 3,128 renunciants in the former against only 3,000 losing citizenship or permanent residence by any means in the latter.

United States Citizenship and Immigration Services stated, in response to a 2013 Freedom of Information Act request, that an average of 18,196 people per year filed Form I-407 to abandon their LPR status in each of Fiscal Years 2010 through 2012. In 2014 Paperwork Reduction Act filings, USCIS estimated that annually, 9,371 people would file Form I-407 in the following three years. The State Department estimated in 2007 that annually, 2,298 people file Form DS-4079 to relinquish their United States citizenship. Finally, the IRS estimated in 2012 that Notices 97-19 and 98-34, which "provide guidance regarding the federal tax consequences for certain individuals who lose U.S. citizenship" or "cease to be taxed as U.S. lawful permanent residents", apply to 12,350 people annually.

The State Department stated that 1,100 people renounced citizenship at only one particular US consulate post during the first ten months of 2014. There are more than 270 US consular posts. In September 2015, the State Department estimated that there would be 5,986 renunciants and 559 relinquishers during Fiscal Year 2015.

Statistics

"Count of names" refers to the number of entries contained in that quarter's list. This figure may include names which are duplicated in previous lists, as well as erroneous list entries such as a street address in Switzerland which was listed as the name of a person giving up citizenship in the fourth quarter of 2013. "Publication delay" refers to the number of days between the end of the calendar quarter and the day on which the list appeared in the Federal Register. Delays longer than the maximum 30 days required by law are shown in red.

Titles
Since 2022, the title of the publication has been Quarterly Publication of Individuals, Who Have Chosen To Expatriate. Previously, the title was Quarterly Publication of Individuals, Who Have Chosen To Expatriate, as Required by Section 6039G in every edition except:

Before 2022, the publication incorrectly spelled the acronym of the Health Insurance Portability and Accountability Act (HIPAA) as "HIPPA" in all but six editions (Q2 1999, Q1 2008, Q2 2008, Q3 2009, Q4 2011, Q3 2015).

See also
Relinquishment of United States nationality

References

Internal Revenue Service
Publications of the United States government
United States nationality law
Personal taxes in the United States
1995 introductions